Ivelina Monova (born ) is a Bulgarian female volleyball player. She is a member of the Bulgaria women's national volleyball team and played for Maritza Plovdiv in 2014. 

She was part of the Bulgarian national team at the 2014 FIVB Volleyball Women's World Championship in Italy.
She competed at the 2009 Women's European Volleyball Championship, and at the 2011 Women's European Volleyball Championship. 
On club level she played for Maritza Plovdiv.

Clubs
  Maritza Plovdiv (2014)

References

1986 births
Living people
Bulgarian women's volleyball players
Place of birth missing (living people)
Liberos